Talcher State was one of the princely states of India during the period of the British Raj. Talcher town in Angul District was the capital of the state and the seat of the Raja's residence. Its last ruler signed the accession to the Indian Union in 1948.

History
The origins of the state of Talcher goes back to 1471 CE during the reign of Purushottama Deva of the Gajapati Empire in the region when the overlordship of Bhimanagari was established by Narahari Singh who was the scion of the family of the ruling Suryavanshi Gajapati Kings of Odisha. In the late 16th century under the reign of Padmanabha Birabara Harichandan, the kingdom was renamed as Talcher after the name of the family goddess Taleshwari in 1578.

The state's accession to the Indian Union was signed by its last ruler Hrudaya Chandra Dev Birabar Harichandan Mahapatra on 1 January 1948.

Rulers
The rulers of Talcher:

Narahari Singh (1471 - 1480 CE)
Udayanarayana Singh (1480 - 1520)
Govind Charan Singh (1520 - 1527)
...
Padmanabha Birabara Harichandan (1575 - 1598)
Chakradhar Birabara Harichandan (1598 - 1651)
Gopinath Birabara Harichandan (1651 - 1711) 
Ramchandra Birabara Harichandan (1711 - 1729)
Pitambar Birabara Harichandan (1729 - 1740)                
Lal Singh (1740 - 1752)
Krishna Chandra Birabara Harichandan (1752 - ...)
...
Ramchandra (Ayadi) Birabara Harichandan (1766 - 1774)
Nimai Charan Champati Birabara Harichandan (1774 - 1778)
Bhagirathi Birabara Harichandan (1778 - 1846)
Dayanidhi Birabara Harichandan Mahapatra (1846 - 1873)
Ramchandra Deba Birabara Harichandan Mahapatra (1873 - 18 Dec 1891)
Kishor Chandra Deba Birabara Harichandan Mahapatra (18 Dec 1891 - 7 Nov 1945)
Hrudaya Chandra Deba Birabara Harichandan Mahapatra (7 Nov 1945 – 1 January 1948)

Titular
Hrudaya Chandra Deba Birabara Harichandan Mahapatra (1 January 1948 - 11 September 1970)
Soubhagya Chandra Deba Birabara Harichandan Mahapatra (11 September 1970 - 14 March 2008)
Rajendra Chandra Deba Birabara Harichandan Mahapatra (14 March 2008 - current)

See also 
 Eastern States Agency
 Talcher

References

External links

Princely states of Odisha
History of Odisha
Angul district